Antigius is a genus of butterflies in the family Lycaenidae. The species of this genus are found in the eastern Palearctic realm (China, Korea, Japan, and the Russian Far East), as well as Taiwan and Myanmar.

Species
Antigius attilia (Bremer, 1861)
Antigius butleri (Fenton, 1881)
Antigius cheni Koiwaya, 2004
Antigius jinpingi Hsu, 2009
Antigius shizuyai Koiwaya, 2002

External links
A new species of Antigius (Lepidoptera: Lycaenidae: Theclini) from Taiwan
"Antigius Sibatani & Ito, 1942" at Markku Savela's Lepidoptera and Some Other Life Forms
Images representing Antigius at Consortium for the Barcode of Life

Theclini
Lycaenidae genera
Palearctic Lepidoptera